Pida is a village development committee in Dhading District in the Bagmati Zone of central Nepal. At the time of the 1991 Nepal census it had a population of 7977 and had 1417 houses in it. It is one of the beautiful villages in Nepal with a lot of natural and artificial (artistic) attractions.

References

Populated places in Dhading District